The Heart of the North is a 1921 American silent western film directed by Harry Revier and starring Roy Stewart, Harry von Meter and Louise Lovely. Produced by the independent Quality Film Productions, it is a Northern featuring an officer of the Royal Canadian Mounted Police.

Cast
 Roy Stewart as Sgt. John Whiley / 'Bad' Maupome
 George Morrell as 	Father Ormounde
 Harry von Meter as 	De Brac
 Roy Justi as Sir Archibald
 William Lion West as 	Mad Pierre Maupome
 Louise Lovely as 	Patricia Graham
 Betty Marvin as 	Rosa De Brac

References

Bibliography
 Munden, Kenneth White. The American Film Institute Catalog of Motion Pictures Produced in the United States, Part 1. University of California Press, 1997.

External links
 

1920s American films
1921 films
1921 Western (genre) films
1920s English-language films
American silent feature films
Silent American Western (genre) films
American black-and-white films
Films directed by Harry Revier
Films set in Canada